Kim Hyung-chil (Hangul: 김형칠, Hanja: 金亨七) (1 July 1959 in Gwangju - 7 December 2006 in Doha) was a South Korean horse rider. He was a silver medalist in the three-day team event at the 2002 Asian Games in Busan, and was the oldest member of South Korea's equestrian team. Kim participated in the Seoul 1988 and Barcelona 1992 Summer Olympics and also featured in the World Championships in equestrianism.

He died on December 7, 2006, when he fell from his horse during the 2006 Asian Games Equestrian competition. The incident occurred on jump No. 8 during the cross country stage of the three-day event, Asian Games organizing committee spokesman Ahmed Abdulla Al Khulaifi said. After steady rain, the track condition was far from ideal and although the first 10 competitors finished the race without incident, tragedy struck for Kim, the 11th competitor of the race.

Television footage shows that his horse, Bundaberg Black, got caught in a fence obstacle, first throwing Kim over the obstacle, and then itself being catapulted over, crushing the front of Kim's head and his chest area when its flanks landed on him. Kim never regained consciousness and died shortly before noon local time. According to Abduluahab al-Museh, the organizing committee's doping and medical staff, during the accident, he suffered from severe trauma to his head, neck and upper chest and had multiple skull fractures.

Kim's death was the first fatality in the cross-country event in Asian Games history, and the first South Korean fatality at a major international equestrian event.

References

External links 
Profile at doha-2006.com
Report at aljazeera.net
Report at foxsports.com
Report at ESPN.com

1959 births
2006 deaths
Olympic equestrians of South Korea
Equestrians at the 1988 Summer Olympics
Equestrians at the 2004 Summer Olympics
South Korean male equestrians
Deaths by horse-riding accident
Sport deaths in Qatar
Asian Games medalists in equestrian
Equestrians at the 1998 Asian Games
Equestrians at the 2002 Asian Games
Equestrians at the 2006 Asian Games
Asian Games silver medalists for South Korea
Medalists at the 2002 Asian Games